Sybil Seely (born Sibye Trevilla, January 2, 1900 – June 26, 1984) was a silent film actress who worked with the well known silent film comedy actor Buster Keaton. She was credited in some of her films as Sibye Trevilla.

Early years
Seely was born to Harry Travilla and Lucie Ellen Boyker in Los Angeles, the sixth of seven children. She was of French, English, and Scottish descent. Her three brothers performed "as the Travilla Brothers, a popular vaudeville act featuring stunts in a huge onstage tank using a trained seal named Winks, advertised as 'The Seal With The Human Brain.'”

Career
Seely is known to have appeared in 23 films, and her first role, according to IMDb, was an uncredited part in Her Nature Dance (1917), at the age of 17. This picture was made for the Mack Sennett studio, where she began as a "Bathing Beauty" and where she was under contract for all of her short career. Sennett loaned her to Buster Keaton for five short films, including her first role with the great silent screen comedian as his bride and fellow ill-fated house-kit-builder in One Week (1920). This is the role for which Seely is best known, and her unflappable screen personality, as well as the ability to keep up with Keaton and perform her own stunts, earned her the roles in the four other Keaton two-reelers. The final role of her short career was in Buster Keaton's The Frozen North (1922).

Family
In 1920, she married screenwriter Jules Furthman. They had a son, Jules Jr. In 1922, she retired from her acting career.

Death
Seely was diagnosed with colon cancer in 1983 and also suffered from cerebral arteriosclerosis at the time of her death from cardiac failure in Culver City, California, aged 84, on June 26, 1984.

Filmography
Hearts and Flowers (1919)
A Lady's Tailor (1919)
Salome vs. Shenandoah (1919)
Up in Alf's Place (1919)
His Last False Step (1919)
Down on the Farm (1920)
By Golly! (1920)
Married Life (1920)
One Week (1920)
Convict 13 (1920)
Movie Fans (1920)
 Love, Honor and Behave (1920)
The Scarecrow (1920) (uncredited)
Bungalow Troubles (1920)
The Boat (1921)
A Sailor-Made Man (1921)
On Patrol (1922)
The Frozen North (1922)

References

External links

 One Week (1920) at Internet Archive
 Convict 13 (1920) at Internet Archive
 The Scarecrow (1920) at Internet Archive
 The Boat (1921) at Internet Archive
 The Frozen North (1922) at Internet Archive

American film actresses
American silent film actresses
Actresses from Los Angeles
Deaths from colorectal cancer
Deaths from cerebrovascular disease
Deaths from arteriosclerosis
Deaths from cancer in California
Neurological disease deaths in California
1900 births
1984 deaths
Burials at Forest Lawn Memorial Park (Glendale)
20th-century American actresses